Clifford Forsythe, the Ulster Unionist Party Member of Parliament for South Antrim, died on 27 April 2000; as result, a by-election was held in the constituency on 21 September 2000.

Candidates

The election arose after the Good Friday Agreement, with prisoner releases having started, but before the pro-agreement parties had reached agreement on the shape of a devolved government. After a disputatious selection contest, the London-based public relations executive David Burnside was selected as the new Ulster Unionist Party candidate. Burnside claimed to have supported the Agreement at the time of its negotiation but to have since turned against the way in which it was being implemented. However this was at odds with his party's policy. This was seized upon by the Democratic Unionist Party candidate, former Mid-Ulster MP Rev. William McCrea in campaigning. McCrea campaigned on a policy of refusal to co-operate with Sinn Féin in the absence of progress on arms decommissioning.

The Northern Ireland Unionist Party initially selected Norman Boyd, who was a local member of the Northern Ireland Assembly (elected as a member of the United Kingdom Unionist Party). However, during the campaign Boyd withdrew, urging voters not to divide the anti-agreement vote, and supported McCrea. Although the Progressive Unionist Party had secured 8.7% of the vote at the previous general election, they did not stand on this occasion.

The Alliance Party of Northern Ireland selected David Ford, who was a member of the Northern Ireland Assembly for the area and who had previously fought the seat in the 1997 general election. With all the Unionist candidates opposed to the Good Friday Agreement to some degree, Ford hoped to gain the support of pro Agreement unionist voters. However, with the Unionist parties fighting fiercely, Ford faced the difficult task of convincing voters that a vote for the Alliance was not wasted, especially when many who supported the Agreement argued that the best realistic result for maintaining it would be for Burnside to win the seat.

The nationalist SDLP also ran their local assembly member, in this case Donovan McClelland. With the constituency overwhelmingly Protestant the SDLP had no chance of winning and much of the spotlight on them concerned their electoral battle with Sinn Féin as a prelude to forthcoming Assembly elections. Sinn Féin had no Assembly members but ran Martin Meehan, who had been their sole Assembly candidate the last time, in the hope of increasing his profile and building up their local organisation in preparation for a shot at the next election. The battle between McClelland and Meehan attracted much attention as it would indicate the movement of votes within the nationalist community between the two parties, though most agreed that it was always likely for the SDLP to come out on top in the highly middle-class constituency.

In addition the Natural Law Party selected David Collins. This was to be one of the last occasions that the party would fight an election in Northern Ireland.

Campaign

With delays over the selection and the summer holiday intervening, polling day in the by-election was held off until 21 September, allowing extensive campaigning. The constituency is strongly Protestant and it was always clear that the real contest was between the two Unionist parties. Away from these two, interest was piqued by the advance of Sinn Féin, overtaking the Alliance in the number of votes won. Many believed that this heralded the former party subsequently taking the latter's Assembly seat in the next assembly election, but in the event Ford narrowly held on.

Results

General Election result, 1997

See also
List of United Kingdom by-elections

References

External links
British Parliamentary By Elections: Campaign literature from the by-election
A Vision Of Britain Through Time (Constituency elector numbers)

By-elections to the Parliament of the United Kingdom in County Antrim constituencies
2000 elections in the United Kingdom
2000 elections in Northern Ireland
20th century in County Antrim
September 2000 events in the United Kingdom